Jay Lynch may refer to:

 Jay Lynch (d. 1919) Lynching victim in Lamar, Missouri on May 28, 1919
 Jay Lynch (footballer) (b. 1993)
 Jay Patrick Lynch (1945 – 2017) was an American cartoonist